The Gary Albright Benefit Memorial Show was a professional wrestling event produced by World Xtreme Wrestling (WXW) promotion which took place on April 19, 2000, at the Agricultural Hall in Allentown, Pennsylvania. It was held in memory of wrestler Gary Albright, the son-in-law of promoter Afa Anoa'i and a mainstay of All Japan Pro Wrestling, who suffered a fatal heart attack at a WXW event in Hazleton, Pennsylvania three months earlier. Twelve professional wrestling matches were featured on the event's card, with two including championships.

The event featured wrestlers from both All-Japan Pro Wrestling and the World Wrestling Federation, as well as members of the Anoa'i family including Afa, Jr. and Lloyd Anoa'i, Samula Anoa'i and Jimmy Snuka. Dwayne "The Rock" Johnson, another relative, made a special afternoon appearance at the Wild Samoan Training Center to make a pre-recorded message aired at the start of the event; this was followed by a live appearance by WWF Hall of Famer Bob Backlund later on in the show. Although a number of major stars were scheduled to be on the card, including Gangrel and Luna Vachon, Cactus Jack, Sabu and "Dr. Death" Steve Williams, many were unable to attend at the last minute. Others, most notably Rob Van Dam, were on hand for autograph signings.

The main event was a standard wrestling match between WWF wrestlers, Rikishi Phatu, and the challenger, The Road Dogg, which was followed by an impromptu four-way match with Too Cold Scorpio and Chris Jericho. Another featured match was Chris Jericho versus WWF European Champion Eddie Guerrero, in a non-title match which Jericho won. The Headbangers (Mosh and Thrasher) beat Kai En Tai (Sho Funaki and Taka Michinoku), and Maunakea Mossman, who was accompanied by Nicole Bass, defeated Johnny Smith. This was the first-ever match that Mossman had wrestled in the United States.

Results

See also
List of professional wrestling memorial shows

References

External links
Gary Albright Memorial Show at Cagematch.net
Gary Albright Memorial Show at WrestlingData.com

2000 in professional wrestling
Professional wrestling memorial shows
Events in Pennsylvania
Professional wrestling in Pennsylvania
April 2000 events in the United States
2000 in Pennsylvania